Jinxing Road station is a subway station in Changsha, Hunan, China, operated by the Changsha subway operator Changsha Metro.

Station layout
The station has one island platform.

History
The station opened on 29 April 2014.

Surrounding area
Huxiang Cancer Hospital of Traditional Chinese Medicine (Chinese:湖湘中医肿瘤医院)

References

Railway stations in Hunan
Railway stations in China opened in 2014